The 2016 Summer Paralympics, the 15th Summer Paralympic Games, were a major international multi-sport event for athletes with disabilities governed by the International Paralympic Committee, held in Rio de Janeiro, Brazil, from 7 to 18 September 2016. The Games marked the first time a Latin American and South American city hosted the event, the second Southern Hemisphere city and nation, the first one being the 2000 Summer Paralympics in Sydney, and also the first time a Lusophone (Portuguese-speaking) country hosted the event. These Games saw the introduction of two new sports to the Paralympic program: canoeing and the paratriathlon.

The lead-up to these Paralympics were met with financial shortcomings attributed to tepid sponsor interest and ticket sales, which resulted in cuts to volunteer staffing and transport, the re-location of events and the partial deconstruction of the Deodoro venue cluster. However, ticket sales began to increase as the Games drew nearer, and over two million tickets were sold in total—overtaking Beijing 2008 as the second-most-attended Paralympic Games on record.

A refugee Paralympic team was hosted for the first time, featuring two refugees from Iran and Syria respectively. For the fourth consecutive Summer Paralympics, China topped the medal table, winning 107 gold medals, followed by Great Britain and Ukraine, while Georgia, Kazakhstan, Malaysia, Uzbekistan, and Vietnam won their first ever Paralympic gold medals. For the first time in Paralympic history, and the first time in the Olympics or Paralympics since 1960, an athlete—Iranian cyclist Bahman Golbarnezhad—died during competition.

Bidding process

As part of a formal agreement between the International Paralympic Committee and the International Olympic Committee first established in 2001, the winner of the bid for the 2016 Summer Olympics was also to host the 2016 Summer Paralympics. Following the third and final round of voting at the 121st IOC Session in Copenhagen on 2 October 2009, the right to host the 2016 Summer Olympics and Paralympics were awarded to Rio de Janeiro.

Development and preparation
The 2007 Pan American Games and Parapan American Games in Rio de Janeiro marked the first time that the Pan Am Games and Parapan Am Games were hosted as parallel events in the same host city; Rio's organization of the two events helped provide the city with experience in hosting multi-sport events, and Paralympic sporting events. Andrew Parsons, president of the Brazilian Paralympic Committee, remarked that the organizing teams responsible for the Olympics and Paralympics were maintaining a good relationship and "speaking the same language" in relation to their organizational duties. Parsons praised how well-organized the 2012 Summer Paralympics were, and felt that his team had learned lessons from London that could be applied in Rio.

Venues

As had been common practice since the Olympics and Paralympics began to formally share host cities, the Paralympics' venues were shared with those of the 2016 Summer Olympics. Barra da Tijuca hosted most of the venues, with the remainder located in Copacabana Beach, Maracanã and Deodoro. Barra da Tijuca also housed the athletes' village.

Barra cluster
 Carioca Arena 1 – Wheelchair basketball, wheelchair rugby
 Carioca Arena 2 – Boccia
 Carioca Arena 3 – Judo, wheelchair fencing
 Future Arena – Goalball
 Olympic Aquatics Stadium – Swimming
 Olympic Tennis Centre – 5-a-side football, wheelchair tennis
 Pontal Beach – Road cycling
 Riocentro – Powerlifting, Sitting volleyball, table tennis
 Rio Olympic Arena – Wheelchair basketball
 Rio Olympic Velodrome – Track cycling

Deodoro cluster
 National Shooting Center – shooting
 National Equestrian Center – equestrian
 Deodoro Stadium – 7-a-side football

Maracanã cluster
 Maracanã Stadium – opening and closing ceremonies
 Estádio Olímpico João Havelange – athletics (track and field)
 Sambadrome Marquês de Sapucaí – archery

Copacabana cluster
 Fort Copacabana – Athletics, Triathlon and Road Cycling
 Marina da Glória – sailing
 Lagoa Rodrigo de Freitas – canoeing and rowing

Medals

The medal design for the 2016 Olympics and Paralympics were unveiled on 14 June 2016; they were produced by the Casa da Moeda do Brasil. The bronze and silver medals contain 30% recycled materials, while the gold medals were produced using gold that had been mined and extracted using means that met a series of sustainability criteria, such as being extracted without the use of mercury. The obverse of the Paralympic medals feature the Paralympic emblem and an inscription in braille, while each medal contains differing numbers of metal balls to allow the visually impaired to audibly distinguish their color by shaking them. They are accompanied by a wooden carrying box, and a plush toy of Paralympic mascot Tom with hair leaves that match the medal's color.

Ticketing 
The initial financial shortcomings of the 2016 Paralympics were primarily attributed to slow ticket sales and poor public interest, despite the cheapest tickets only costing roughly a quarter of those for the Olympics. During the Olympics, organizers stated that only 12% of an original target of 3.3 million tickets had been sold. By early September, only half of the tickets to medal events had been sold.

On 23 August 2016, Greg Nugent, who was head of marketing of the 2012 Summer Olympics and 2012 Summer Paralympics, began a campaign on Twitter known as "#FillTheSeats", encouraging users to donate money to supply local youth and people with disabilities with tickets to the Paralympics. Nugent began the campaign after noticing the large number of empty seats at competition venues during the 2016 Summer Olympics. Following endorsements of the campaign by prominent figures, such as British band Coldplay (which performed the closing ceremony in 2012), it raised over US$15,000 by 30 August. On 31 August 2016, the IPC and the Rio 2016 Organizing Committee announced that it would officially back the #FillTheSeats campaign, and set a new goal of $300,000—which the IPC said could be used to fund the distribution of 10,000 tickets, along with food and transport, for the opening ceremony to Brazilian scholars and disabled peoples.

As part of a revised ticketing strategy, the organizers set a new target of 2.4 million tickets, with the cheapest tickets costing R$10 (US$3) each. Ticketing director Donovan Ferreti told The Guardian that a "last-minute" demand for tickets had begun to develop in the final days before the opening ceremony. He explained that the tickets were "really affordable" and "cheaper than going to see a movie", and would allow spectators to "have a great time with high-performance competition and have a great day out in the Olympic Park." The low cost of tickets helped to attract attendees to the Paralympics—especially families, while athletes praised the large and energetic crowds that resulted.

On the third day of the Games, the IPC announced that at least 1.8 million tickets had been sold—surpassing the 1.7 million of the 2008 Summer Paralympics in Beijing as the second-largest Paralympics in terms of ticket sales. The next day, Barra Olympic Park had a total attendance of 167,675, marking its largest overall attendance across a single day of competition during either the Olympics or Paralympics (the Olympics only reached a peak of around 157,000). On 14 September, the IPC announced that sales had exceeded 2 million.

Torch relay

The Paralympic torch relay began with five individual flames being relayed to a city in each of the five regions of Brazil. These flames, as well as a sixth flame lit in Stoke Mandeville, Great Britain, were united to form a single Paralympic flame, which was relayed through Rio on 6 and 7 September 2016 en route to its lighting at the Maracanã during the opening ceremony.

Route

Marketing

Emblem 

The official emblem for the 2016 Summer Paralympics was designed by the Brazilian agency Tatíl Design, and unveiled on 26 November 2011 during the Christmas tree lighting at the Lagoa Rodrigo de Freitas. It consists of a heart incorporating the infinity symbol, representing a beating heart and an "infinite energy to overcome obstacles". IPC president Philip Craven described the emblem as symbolizing the "heart" of athletes, who were the "heart" of the Paralympic movement.

As with the Olympic emblem, the Paralympic emblem was designed so that it could also be rendered in two- and three-dimensional versions, such as a sculpture that was used during the unveiling.

Mascot 

The official mascots of the 2016 Summer Olympics and Paralympics were unveiled on 24 November 2014, with their respective names, Vinicius and Tom, chosen via a public vote whose results were announced on 14 December 2014. The Paralympic mascot, Tom, is named after Brazilian musician Tom Jobim; it represents Brazilian flora and "is always growing and overcoming obstacles." The mascots' fictional backstories state that they were both born from the joy of Brazilians after it was announced that Rio would host the Games. Brand director Beth Lula stated that the mascots are intended to reflect the diversity of Brazil's culture and people.

The Games

Opening ceremony 

 
The opening ceremony of the 2016 Summer Paralympics took place on the evening of 7 September 2016 at Maracanã Stadium, which was also Brazilian Independence Day. With the theme "Todo Mundo tem um Coração" ("Everybody Has a Heart"), the artistic portions of the ceremony featured sequences themed around inclusivity and the culture of Brazil. The segment "Beyond Vision" was created by computation artist and designer Marcelo Coelho with projections by Muti Randolph.

During the parade of nations, a Belarusian official carried a Russian flag alongside his delegation as solidarity towards the IPC's decision to ban Russia from the Games. In the wake of ongoing protests over political instability in Brazil, spectators also booed organizing committee head Carlos Arthur Nuzman after he thanked local governments for their role in organizing the Games, and President Michel Temer whilst he opened the Games, in response to the recent impeachment of former president Dilma Rousseff.

In an opening speech, IPC president Philip Craven invited viewers to "see the true meaning of sport and the true definition of ability", explaining that "in a country which has faced major challenges of late, Paralympians will switch your focus from perceived limitations, to a world full of possibility and endless opportunity. They will surprise you, inspire and excite you, but most of all they will change you." The Paralympic cauldron was lit by legendary Brazilian para-swimmer Clodoaldo Silva.

Participating nations
4,342 athletes representing 159 National Paralympic Committees competed in Rio. The number of athletes sent by each nation is shown beside its name. This is also the first Summer Paralympics event where Russia is not participating, owing to the doping allegations. Aruba, Congo, Malawi, São Tomé and Príncipe, Somalia, and Togo made their debut in the Summer Paralympics.

The IPC unanimously voted to ban Russian athletes from the 2016 Summer Paralympics in response to the discovery of a state-sponsored doping program. On 5 August 2016, the IPC announced that it would field a team of refugee athletes known as the Independent Paralympic Athletes Team, which competed under the Paralympic flag. The 2016 Summer Olympics similarly featured a team of 10 refugee athletes. On 26 August 2016, the IPC announced the two members of the refugee team: swimmer Ibrahim Al Hussein of Syria (50 and 100 metre Freestyle S10), and Shahrad Nasajpour of Iran (F37 Discus).

Number of athletes by National Paralympic Committees (by highest to lowest)

Sports
Events in 22 sports were contested at the 2016 Summer Paralympics. Canoeing and paratriathlon made their Paralympic debut in Rio.

 Archery
 Athletics
 Boccia
  Paracanoe
 Cycling
  Road
  Track
 Equestrian
 Football 5-a-side
 Football 7-a-side
 Goalball
 Judo
 Paratriathlon
 Powerlifting
 Rowing
 Sailing
 Shooting
 Swimming
 Table tennis
 Volleyball
 Wheelchair basketball
 Wheelchair fencing
 Wheelchair rugby
 Wheelchair tennis

Closing ceremony 

The closing ceremony of the 2016 Summer Paralympics took place on the evening of 18 September 2016 at the Maracanã Stadium. The cultural program of the ceremony was a concert featuring performances by an array of mainstream Brazilian musicians, headlined by Ivete Sangalo and Gaby Amarantos. British singer Calum Scott joined Sangalo to perform "Transformar", the official promotional song of the Games. It also featured a cultural presentation by Tokyo, host of the 2020 Summer Paralympics

IPC president Philip Craven led a moment of silence for Iranian cyclist Bahman Golbarnezhad (who was killed the day before in a road cycling accident), stating that his death had "affected us all and left the whole Paralympic Movement united in grief." Craven went on to praise Brazil's reception to the Games and the overall performances of athletes, stating that people "were in awe at what you could do and forgot about what they believed you could not. You showed to the world that with a positive attitude the human body, and above all the human heart and mind, knows no limits and absolutely anything is possible." Craven also announced that he would bestow the Paralympic Order—the IPC's highest honour, on the people of Brazil and Rio de Janeiro for their "outstanding support" of the Paralympics.

Calendar

Medal table

Podium Sweeps

Records

Broadcasting
On 24 August 2016, the IPC announced that Dailymotion would serve as the official online streaming partner for the 2016 Summer Paralympics, offering 15 English-language streaming channels with full broadcasts of athletics, cycling, football, judo, powerlifting, sitting volleyball, swimming, table tennis, wheelchair basketball, wheelchair fencing, wheelchair rugby and wheelchair tennis events, as well as the ceremonies, highlights from all events, news programmes, and other original content. In total, the IPC stated that around 680 hours of content would be streamed over the 11-day event, with at least 72 hours per-day.

Television rights were also sold to individual countries: Grupo Globo held rights in Brazil, with coverage shown on Rede Globo and SporTV. Globo also sublicensed over-the-air rights to the public network TV Brasil.

In the United Kingdom, Channel 4 broadcast the Games as its second Summer Paralympics, promising 500 hours of coverage. As a follow-up to its "Meet the Superhumans" trailer for the 2012 Paralympics, Channel 4 produced a trailer entitled "We're the Superhumans", which would win a Cannes Lions Grand Prix for film.

In Australia, the Seven Network held rights, complementing a new long-term rights deal for the Olympics. Seven plans to broadcast 14 hours per-day of coverage on television. Coverage was primarily broadcast by its digital channel 7Two and Seven's digital platforms, as well as a Paralympics-specific app.

In Canada, CBC, Sportsnet One and AMI-tv held broadcast rights, promoting 1000 hours of coverage in total on television and the CBC Sports website. CBC Television aired the ceremonies, a nightly recap show, and afternoon and evening coverage blocks on weekends.

In Latin America (except Brazil), Claro Sports, ESPN and Fox Sports held the rights broadcast the 2016 Summer Paralympics.

NBC acquired the rights to the 2014 and 2016 Paralympics in September 2013. NBC planned extensive coverage for both games, capitalizing on its newly acquired status of an official Paralympic broadcaster in the United States.

In Sweden, state broadcaster SVT broadcast the Games, planning 300 hours of coverage on television and digital platforms, as well as a nightly highlights show.

In Poland, state broadcaster TVP broadcast the games for the first time.

In New Zealand, Attitude Pictures and Television New Zealand partnered to broadcast 180 hours of live and delayed television coverage, plus on-demand highlights through their respective digital platforms.

Concerns and controversies

Budget cuts 
The budget of the 2016 Summer Paralympics faced several rounds of cuts, although the Rio 2016 Organizing Committee did not provide specific details on the deficits.

In mid-August 2016, it was reported that the Rio 2016 Organizing Committee had failed to timely deliver US$8 million in travel grants that were intended to be paid out at the end of July. Without these grants, National Paralympic Committees may have had to cover a larger share of the cost of transporting their athletes to the Games, while some (particularly those in African and Asian regions) might not have been able to afford sending their athletes to Rio at all. On 15 August 2016, a spokesperson for the organizing committee credited the financial issues to the political climate making it harder to reach sponsorship deals, as well as ticket sales being below expectations. However, the spokesperson noted that the ongoing Olympics were helping to attract interest from potential sponsors. The ROC stated that it planned to deliver the money by the end of the month and that there was "no intention" to "compromise the Paralympic experience". Mayor of Rio Eduardo Paes offered to provide US$47 million in funding to the Games to address these shortcomings, but a federal court blocked the further provision of public funding to the ROC pending the inspection of its financial records.

IPC president Philip Craven stated that "although the situation is pretty precarious, rumours that the Games may not go ahead or that sports may be cut are totally unfounded and not true. Our aim right now is to bring in additional funding and resources in order to deliver the Games at the service levels expected by all stakeholders, most importantly the athletes", and "if no more funding is available then the Organising Committee's additional cuts will start to impact on the services offered to the athletes who have dedicated years of their lives to reach and compete at these Games. This is the last thing that we want to do." On 19 August 2016, the IPC stated that the organising committee had made infrastructural reductions for the Games as a budgetary measure, including reducing the amount of transport services and the number of media centres, moving the wheelchair fencing events from Youth Arena to Carioca Arena 3, as well as closing and dismantling Deodoro Olympic Park so that the remaining venues in the cluster can act as "three standalone venues with dedicated transport hubs." Some public parties and gatherings related to the Games were also cancelled.

Of these changes, Craven stated that "it's in our Paralympic DNA to see obstacles as an opportunity to do things differently and that's what we are doing here. We are problem solvers by nature and fight for what we believe in", and iterated that he was "fully confident Rio 2016 will be the best Games ever in terms of athletic performance." Craven explained that "We want full participation here. We want all eligible countries to send their athletes to the Games. It's what the athletes deserve, and it is what the athletes want after years of training and dedication." The injunction was lifted on 18 August 2016, resulting in Paes offering R$150 million in public money to fund the Games. R$100 million worth of sponsorship deals were also reached with the federal government via state-run enterprises. The funding was eventually delivered, ensuring that all 165 delegations would be able to attend the Games.

Death of road cyclist 

On 17 September 2016, during the men's C4-5 road cycling event, Iranian cyclist Bahman Golbarnejhad crashed on a "mountainous stretch" of the circuit in Grumari; after being treated on site for head injuries, he experienced cardiac arrest during ambulance transport. Golbarnejhad died at Unimed Rio hospital after another cardiac arrest. This marked the first instance of a death in Paralympic competition, and the first death in an Olympic or Paralympic competition since that of Danish cyclist Knud Enemark Jensen at a time trial in the 1960 Summer Olympics.

The Union Cycliste Internationale (UCI) announced that it would investigate the incident, and the I. R. Iran National Paralympic Committee requested a report on the incident from the IPC. IPC president Philip Craven expressed condolences for Golbarnezhad, stating that "the Paralympic Family is united in grief at this horrendous tragedy which casts a shadow over what have been great Paralympic Games here in Rio."

The Iranian and Paralympic flags in the athletes' village were flown at half-mast, as well as the Paralympic flag at Riocentro. A moment of silence was observed during the closing ceremony.

See also

 2015 Parapan American Games 
 2016 Summer Olympics
 Rising Phoenix, documentary about the Paralympic movement that covers the financial difficulties of the 2016 Paralympic Games

References

External links

 Rio de Janeiro 2016 Official Homepage
 Rio de Janeiro 2016 from the International Paralympic Committee
Results & Records

 
Summer Paralympic Games
Summer Paralympics
International sports competitions in Rio de Janeiro (city)
ParaLympic
Paralympic Games
Summer Paralympics
2010s in Rio de Janeiro